Denis O'Mulkyran (died 1224) was Archdeacon of Ardcarne in the mid-13th century.

References 

1224 deaths
Year of birth unknown

13th-century Irish Roman Catholic priests
Archdeacons of Ardcarne